Monte Ávila Editores is the largest and most important publishing house in Venezuela. Between 1980 and 2000 it published over 300 titles, largely by Venezuelan authors, producing over 1.2m copies.

Founded in 1968 on the initiative of author Simón Alberto Consalvi, as of 2009 it has published over 2000 books. Past Directors include Juan Liscano, Rafael Arráiz Lucca.

References

External links
 www.monteavila.gob.ve - Archive link, 14 June 2022

Book publishing companies of Venezuela
Government-owned companies of Venezuela